Korean Central Television / Korean Central TV (KCTV) is a television service operated by the Korean Central Broadcasting Committee, a state-owned broadcaster in North Korea. It is broadcast terrestrially via the Pyongyang TV Tower in Moranbong-guyok, Pyongyang, streamed via the government-run internet television service Manbang, and also uplinked via satellite.

History 

KCTV was established on 1 September 1953, as Pyongyang Television after the Korean War ended. Kim Il-sung personally envisioned that the time was ripe for television broadcasting in North Korea, but this was not yet to happen. Thus, the young service began an 8-year period of preparation for commencement of television broadcasts, with the help of the national government.

The station later was renamed as Central Television Broadcasting System in 1961, and conducted on 1 September the same year its first test broadcasts.

The CTBS-DPRK officially began operations on 3 March 1963, at 19:00 (7:00 pm) KST based in Pyongyang, broadcasting two hours between 19:00 (7:00 pm) until 21:00 (9:00 pm) KST on weekdays only, and then expanding to 4 and later 6 hours.

The network carried live the whole proceedings of the 5th Workers' Party of Korea Congress held on 1 October 1970.

The CTBS would later be renamed Korean Central Television (KCTV) and was officially relaunched at 17:00 (5:00 pm) local time on 3 January 1973 (the first working day in 1973 in North Korea). The broadcasting hours were only on weekdays (workdays in North Korea) and closed on weekends and national holidays.

On 1 July 1974, KCTV presented its first colour telecast, in preparation for the 7th Asian Games in Tehran. After occasional broadcasts,  KCTV began full-time colour broadcasts on 1 September 1977. The first broadcast received via satellite television broadcasts was the opening ceremony of the 1980 Summer Olympics.

KCTV started broadcasting on national holidays on March 1, 1981. On national holidays, the broadcasting time of each station is the same as weekends save for major ones. The channel was the official host broadcaster of the 1989 13th World Festival of Youth and Students.

In September 2012, China Central Television (CCTV) announced that it had recently donated 5 million yuan in new broadcasting equipment to KCTV, which was to be used to improve its programming and prepare for digital television.

By 2015, the station had been producing a growing number of programmes in the 16:9 aspect ratio, but its broadcast transmissions were still limited to a 4:3 standard definition format (with such programmes therefore being letterboxed). On 19 January 2015, KCTV began experimental high-definition transmissions via satellite, although only the live in-vision continuity at sign-on and sign-off was presented in HD. All other programming was presented in standard definition, with widescreen programmes therefore being windowboxed.

Native broadcasts in 16:9 widescreen with stereophonic sound started on 4 December 2017, with KCTV being one of the last state-run broadcasters to do so, albeit several years after other developed and even developing nations have done so.

Programming 
As of May 2022, KCTV broadcasts for around 13 hours daily, from 9:00 a.m. to around 10:45 p.m. PYT. Its sign-on sequence traditionally features the playing of the national anthem "Aegukka", "Song of General Kim Il-sung" and "Song of General Kim Jong-il".

The station's output was dominated by propaganda programs focusing on the history and achievements of the ruling Korean Workers' Party, the Korean People's Army (KPA), its leaders, and the Juche ideology. Locally produced feature films, children's programs, theater, and patriotic musical shows and filmed theatre shows are also shown on the networks. On national holidays, military parades, musical performances and movies, plus more special programs are shown on KCTV with similar programming on its three other sister channels.

Occasionally, dubbed and ideologically safe foreign films and television from allied Russia and China are aired on the network during times of warmer relations with the countries. The Star and The Seventh Bullet were both featured, as was a Chinese television program on the life of Mao Anying from 2010.

By December 2018, KCTV's programmes had begun to gain a more contemporary feel as opposed to the strictly authoritarian style used before, with more programming showcasing the North Korean people. Programmes were observed to have featured more field reporting with visible anchors and production staff, younger hosts and personalities with modern attire, increased use of modern production techniques (such as aerial cameras), and a looser and more energetic presentation. Kim Jong-un's New Year's address similarly saw the leader delivering the speech from an armchair in the Workers' Party headquarters, rather than from a podium in an assembly hall. Western analysts felt that these shifts in tone were intended to make the programmes' production values more in line with international broadcasters (appealing to those that have managed to access such programmes), and to make them more appealing to younger audiences. 

KCTV has broadcast tape delayed airings of international sporting events in a condensed format. For instance, while the country has sub-licensed rights to the Olympic Games from the Seoul Broadcasting System (who serves as rights-holder for all of the Korean Peninsula), KCTV coverage of the 2020 Summer Olympics (which North Korea refused to send athletes to) began two days after the Games had ended, and it did not broadcast any coverage of the 2018 Winter Olympics in South Korea (despite North and South Korea entering as a unified team during the opening ceremonies, and fielding a unified team in women's ice hockey). Its coverage of the 2018 FIFA World Cup excluded matches involving Japan.

In May 2022, following the North's first reported cases of COVID-19 to the public, KCTV extended its broadcast day to begin at 9:00 a.m. daily. Previously, the channel began its broadcast day at 3:00 p.m., and only broadcast from 9:00 a.m. on Sundays, key national holidays, and every 1st, 11th and 21st of each month. This change has persisted as of September 2022.

News operation 

KCTV broadcasts daily news bulletins under the title Bodo ('News' or 'Report'), which serve as one of the main propaganda organs of the Workers' Party of Korea. The day-to-day activities of Supreme Leader Kim Jong-un take precedence over all other headlines, and are presented in a means consistent with other government propaganda. Stories covering the country's military and economy are also featured. Weather reports aired on KCTV place Paektu Mountain—which the country claims to be the birthplace of Kim Jong-il—ahead of all other cities besides the capital of Pyongyang.

North Korean newscasts are long known for being melodramatic; newsreaders use one of five tones—a lofty, wavering one for praising the nation's leaders, an explanatory one for weather forecasts, a conversational one for uncontroversial stories, one denouncing the West and a mournful tone for announcing the death of a North Korean official or leader. Many North Korean journalists who have defected to the South have noted the contrasts with the more conversational South Korean broadcasting style. Long-time chief newsreader Ri Chun-hee is well known for her melodramatic style, and for typically wearing a traditional, pink Chosŏn-ot dress on-air. Ri retired as a full-time anchor in 2012, stating that she wanted to focus more on training a newer generation of broadcasters. She has continued to make infrequent on-air appearances to deliver top-level announcements from the government, such as missile tests, a broadcast discussing the Singapore Summit, and to announce the death of Supreme Leader Kim Jong-il.

By September 2012, after receiving new equipment from Chinese state broadcaster CCTV, KCTV introduced a refreshed set for its bulletins, which featured a new anchor desk and a video backdrop. By December 2018, the bulletins had begun to employ contemporary presentation elements that had been avoided by KCTV, such as double boxes, as part of a larger shift in KCTV's programming. Experiments with further modernization occurred in March and May 2019, when economic reports used three-dimensional infographics (including 3D text overlaid into video footage), drone footage, and time-lapse video.

KCTV may return to air or remain on-air past its usual sign-off time during breaking news situations. On 26 August 2020, KCTV broadcast advisories throughout the day on Typhoon Bavi, including updates from the State Hydro-Meteorological Administration. For what was believed to be the first time ever, KCTV remained on the air overnight, airing a block of films interspersed with the aforementioned updates. The following morning, KCTV broadcast extended coverage of the storm's arrival and impact, including live reports from Pyongyang and Nampo. No other coverage of Typhoon Bavi was seen during KCTV's main news bulletins until 28 August, when a story focused on Kim Jong-un's assessment of damage by the typhoon (as per the aforementioned precedence of his day-to-day activities). A few weeks later, KCTV aired similar coverage of Typhoon Maysak and Typhoon Haishen, building upon the format it had used for the Typhoon Bavi coverage.

Availability 
The station began its first colour broadcasts on 1 July 1974, using the SECAM system with 576i scanning lines, in line with most of the Eastern Bloc at that time. This was replaced with PAL sometime around the early-1990s. On the 54th anniversary of Workers' Party of Korea in 1999, KCTV began a satellite television uplink via Thaicom 3. The station available in Pyongyang, and in other major cities, including Chŏngjin, Hamhŭng, Haeju, Kaesŏng, Sinŭiju, Wŏnsan. 

In 2012, KCTV began experimental digital terrestrial television broadcasts, using the European DVB-T2 standard (in contrast to South Korea, which uses the American ATSC standard; to Japan, which uses its indigenously developed ISDB-T standard; and to China, which uses its indigenously developed DTMB standard).

Outside North Korea 
KCTV was broadcast free-to-air on Thaicom 5 until 25 February 2020, so with the appropriate equipment can be picked up in Southeast Asia, Australasia, Middle East, Africa and Europe. In April 2015, KCTV expanded its satellite broadcast coverage in America and Europe via Intelsat 21. On 18 January 2020, KCTV moved its satellite broadcast on ChinaSat 12 as the Thaicom 5 began experiencing technical difficulties around December 2019.

Since March 2019, KCTV's satellite signal has been relayed with BISS encryption by Koreasat 5A—a South Korean satellite owned by KT Corporation—to allow media outlets and journalists based in Seoul to continue monitoring the channel. The relay was established after 5G NR wireless service began to interfere with the C-band signal.

The daily KCTV news bulletin is also distributed online with Japanese subtitles through a Chongryon-supported website. In 2013, British broadcaster Channel 4 offered editions of the daily bulletin with English subtitles as part of its web series North Korea Uncovered.

Test card 
During the last 30 minutes of the broadcast of the test card, patriotic songs or classical musical works of the DPRK are played. There are minor test card changes from time-to-time.
 c. 1970s? – mid-1990s: modified Philips PM5540/PM5544 hybrid colour testcard without side bars but with digital clock at bottom right (shown before startup). Towards the top of the testcard Chosŏn'gŭl characters for "Pyongyang" are written on either side of a Chollima emblazoned on a blue background.
 mid-1990s – 3 December 2017: EBU Colour Bars (shown after closedown) and modified Philips PM5544 testcard with digital clock (shown before startup). Towards the top of the testcard Chosŏn'gŭl characters for "Pyongyang" are written on either side of a Chollima emblazoned on a blue background.
 4 December 2017 – present: EBU Colour Bars (shown after closedown) and modified Philips PM5644 testcard with digital clock (shown before startup). Towards the top of the testcard Chosŏn'gŭl characters for "Korean Central Television" are written below an image of Mount Paektu's Heaven Lake emblazoned on a sky blue background.

See also 

 Censorship in North Korea
 China Central Television
 Korean Broadcasting System (equivalent in South Korea)
 List of North Korean television series
 Mansudae Television
 Media of North Korea
 Radio jamming in Korea
 Soviet Central Television
 Telecommunications in North Korea
 Television in North Korea
 Vietnam Television

Sources

External links 

 
 
 
 
  - Ministry of Unification 
  - NK News
 

Television in North Korea
Television channels in North Korea
Mass media in Pyongyang
Television channels and stations established in 1963
1963 establishments in North Korea
Legislature broadcasters
Korean-language television stations
Classic television networks
Commercial-free television networks